The 13th Pan American Games were held in Winnipeg, Manitoba, Canada from July 23 to August 8, 1999.

Medals

Gold

Men's Light Flyweight (– 48 kg): Maikro Romero
Men's Featherweight (– 57 kg): Yudel Johnson
Men's Lightweight (– 60 kg): Mario Kindelán
Men's Welterweight (– 67 kg): Juan Hernández Sierra
Men's Light Middleweight (– 71 kg): Jorge Gutiérrez
Men's Middleweight (– 75 kg): Yohanson Martínez
Men's Light Heavyweight (– 81 kg): Humberto Savigne
Men's Heavyweight (– 91 kg): Odlanier Solis
Men's Super Heavyweight (+ 91 kg): Alexis Rubalcaba

Men's Team Competition: Cuba men's national handball team

Men's Extra-Lightweight (– 60 kg): Manolo Poulot
Men's Half-Middleweight (– 81 kg): Gabriel Arteaga
Men's Heavyweight (+ 100 kg): Ángel Sánchez
Women's Extra-Lightweight (– 48 kg): Amarilis Savón
Women's Half-Lightweight (– 52 kg): Legna Verdecia
Women's Lightweight (– 57 kg): Driulis González
Women's Middleweight (– 70 kg): Sibelis Veranes
Women's Half-Heavyweight (– 78 kg): Diadenis Luna
Women's Heavyweight (+ 78 kg): Daima Beltrán

Men's Kumite (– 60 kg): Yusey Padron
Women's Kumite (– 53 kg): Beisy Quintana

Silver

Men's Half-Heavyweight (– 100 kg): Yosvani Kessel

Bronze

Men's Flyweight (– 51 kg): Manuel Mantilla
Men's Bantamweight (– 54 kg): Waldemar Font
Men's Light Welterweight (– 63.5 kg): Diógenes Luña

Women's Team Competition: Cuba women's national handball team

Men's Half-Lightweight (– 66 kg): Yordanis Arencibia
Men's Lightweight (– 73 kg): Israel Hernández
Men's Middleweight (– 90 kg): Yosvany Despaigne
Women's Half-Middleweight (– 63 kg): Kenia Rodríguez

Men's Kumite (– 65 kg): Enrique Vilela
Men's Kumite (– 80 kg): Bravo Rodríguez
Men's Kumite (+ 80 kg): Yoel Díaz

Results by event

Basketball

Men's Team Competition
Team Roster
Yudit Abreu
Roberto Amaro
Edel Casanova
Sergio Ferrer
Andrés González
Radbel Hechevarria
Angel Nuñez
Elieser Rojas
Ariel Ruedas
Ernesto Simon
Juan Vazquez
Amiel Vega

See also
 Cuba at the 2000 Summer Olympics

Nations at the 1999 Pan American Games
P
1999